The Dooley Dipping Vat is a historic former cattle dipping facility in Ouachita National Forest, southeast of Boles, Arkansas. It is located on a high bank of Countiss Creek east of County Road 925 (Dipping Vat Road). It is a U-shaped concrete structure, oriented north–south with a concrete pad at southern (exit) end. It was built about 1920 as part of a state program to eradicate Texas tick fever from the state's cattle. The vat's name derives from James Dooley, who homesteaded a farm in the area.

The vat was listed on the National Register of Historic Places in 2006.

See also
National Register of Historic Places listings in Scott County, Arkansas

References

Agricultural buildings and structures on the National Register of Historic Places in Arkansas
Buildings and structures completed in 1920
National Register of Historic Places in Scott County, Arkansas
1920 establishments in Arkansas
Plunge dips